Line M101 of the Beijing Subway is a rapid transit line under construction in Tongzhou District, Beijing, China. It will run from Shangwuyuan station to Zhangjiawandong station. It is fully underground. It is scheduled to open in 2027. The line will be  in length with 14 stations.

Stations

References

Beijing Subway lines
Proposed public transport in China
Proposed buildings and structures in Beijing